The Cairn Hill transmission site is located on a 277 metre hill (Carn Clonhugh) at Dernacross in County Longford that lies 10 km north east of Longford town.

Cairn Hill was the first of two new UHF television transmission sites to be opened in Ireland by RTÉ in 1978, the other being Three Rock in County Dublin.  This was to facilitate the introduction of the second television channel RTÉ 2 on UHF, as all the available VHF frequencies were in use by existing transmitters in Ireland. The site was located to cover an area of poor reception in the Irish midlands, and when it opened it was the most powerful television transmitter in all of Ireland, with an Effective Radiated Power (ERP) of 800 kW. In later years another two television channels were added, TG4 and TV3.

Digital terrestrial television (DTT) broadcasts began from Cairn Hill in February 2009, with analogue television services subsequently ending nationally on 24 October 2012. Today the transmission site, owned and operated by 2RN (a subsidiary of RTÉ), provides the Irish national DTT service Saorview to an extensive area in central Ireland and also into Northern Ireland. FM radio transmissions from the site began in 2005 but to date (2022) only RTÉ Radio 1 and local station iRadio are broadcast from the site.

Current transmissions

Digital television

FM radio

Cairn Hill relay transmitters

Gallery

References

Transmitter sites in Ireland
1978 establishments in Ireland
Buildings and structures in County Longford